The International Festival of Audiovisual Programmes or International Documentary Festival FIPADOC ( (FIPA)), founded in 1987 by Michel Mitrani (1930-1996), was first held in Cannes in October 1987., In 2019, the FIPA became FIPADOC,,, an international festival specializing in non-fiction films for all screens and all formats.

History 
The festival was moved to Nice in its eighth year (1995), and, since 1997, has been held in Biarritz, France. It is the only international festival that defends all creative genres: drama, series, creative or investigative documentary, performing arts, transmedia and new talent.,,

6 days to meet professionals, directors, viewers and students while discovering the year's best programs. As a veritable observatory of international audiovisual creation, Fipa aims to shine a spotlight on innovative, original programs that are decidedly outside- the-box.,

Fipa is a platform for discovery and debate, a calendar highlight and annual meeting place for television professionals, but also for evermore members of the general public, with attendances increasing each year. The prizes awarded by its prestigious juries serve as benchmarks for the audiovisual sector, and can make-or-break careers and programme sales.,,

These made-for-television productions are screened in optimal conditions: digital images presented in high definition on the big screen and available in French and English.

Numerous conferences, debates and interviews allow for direct contact between creators and their audience.

Editions

2020,,,

2018,
Le 31st edition of Fipa took place in Biarritz from the 23rd until the 28th of January 2018.

Drama 
 Fipa d'or: Cops by Stefan A. Lukacs (Austria)
 Fipa d'or Best Actress: Ursula Strauss in Meine Fremde Freundin (Germany)
 Fipa d'or Best Actor: Tobias Kersloot in Van God Los : Kerstkado (The Netherlands)
 Fipa d'or Best Script: Katrin Bühlig & Daniel Nocke for Meine Fremde Freundin (Germany)
 Fipa d'or Best Original Score: Jesper Ankarfeldt for Van God Los : Kerstkado (The Netherlands)

Series 
 Fipa d'or: Sob Pressão by Jorge Furtado, Mini Kerti, Luiz Noronha, Cláudio Torres & Renato Fagundes (Brazil)
 Fipa d'or Best Actor: Julio Andrade pour le rôle du « Dr. Evandro Moreira » dans Sob Pressão (Brazil)
 Fipa d'or Best Actress: Marjorie Estiano for the character of « Dr. Carolina Almeida » in Sob Pressão (Brazil)
 Fipa d'or Best Script: Jorge Furtado, Lucas Paraizo, Antonio Prata, Marcio Alemão for Sob Pressão (Brazil)
 Fipa d'or Best Original Score: Stephen Rae for Safe Harbour (Australia)

Other formats 
 Fipa d'or Performing Arts: Marianne Faithfull, fleur d’âme by Sandrine Bonnaire (France)
 Fipa d'or International : Stronger Than A Bullet by Maryam Ebrahimi (Sweden, France, Qatar)
 Fipa d'or National : En équilibre de Antarès Bassis & Pascal Auffray
 Special mention National : Les Enfants du 209, rue Saint-Maur, Paris Xe by Ruth Zylberman

Other awards 
 Michel Mitrani Drama Prize: Heyvan by Bahram Ark & Bahman Ark (Iran)
 Michel Mitrani Prize Documentary: Heimat by Sam Peeters (Belgium)
 Innovation Prize: Altération by Jérôme Blanquet (France)
 Erasmus+ Prize: Magic Moments de Martina Buchelová (Slovakia)
 Young Europeans Jury Prize: Enfants du hasard by Thierry Michel & Pascal Colson
 Audience Award: Le temps des égarés by Virginie Sauveur (France)
 Hackathon Prize: Dessine-moi un futur - Developed by the team formed by Alice Bédard, Sandrine Corbeil, Hugo Denepoux, Florian Pannetier, Quentin Piat & Alexandre Rosenthal

2017,
The 30th edition of Fipa took place in Biarritz from the 24th until the 29th of January 2017.

Drama 
 Fipa d'or: NW by Saul Dibb (United-Kingdom)
 Fipa d'or Best Actress: Alba Gaia Bellugi in Manon 20 ans (France)
 Fipa d'or Best Actor: Elias Anton in Barracuda (Australia)
 Fipa d'or Best Script : Jack Thorne for National Treasure [archive] (United-Kingdom)
 Fipa d'or Best Original Score: Cristobal Tapia by Veer for National Treasure [archive](United-Kingdom)

Series 
 Fipa d'or: Ramona by Guillermo Calderón, Carmen Gloria López & Patricio Pereira (Chili)
 Fipa d'or Best Actor: Matteo Simoni, Rik Verheye, Bart Hollanders & Stef Aerts in Callboys (Belgium)
 Fipa d'or Best Actress: Gianina Frutero in Ramona (Chili)
 Fipa d'or Best Script: Aurélien Molas, Valentine Milville & José Caltagirone for Crime Time - Hora de Perigo (France)
 Fipa d'or Best Original Score: Thomas Couzinier & Frédéric Kooshmanian for Zone blanche (France)

Other formats 
 Fipa d'or Documentary:  de Merzak Allouache (Algeria, France)
 Fipa d'or Reportage and Investigation: Ambulance by Mohamed Jabaly (Norway, Palestine)
 Fipa d'or Performing Arts: Currentzis. The Classical Rebel by Bernhard Fleischer (Austria, Germany, France)
 Fipa d'or Smart Fipa: Zero Impunity by Nicolas Blies, Stéphane Hueber-Blies & Marion Guth (Luxembourg, France)

Other awards 
 Michel Mitrani Prize: Sve je više jtvari koje dolaze by Jelena Gavrilović
 Young Europeans Jury Prize: Ambulance by Mohamed Jabaly
 Prix Télérama:  by Merzak Allouache
 Erasmus+ Prize: Polski by Rubén Rojas Cuauhtémoc
 Audience Award: Latifa, une femme dans la république by Jarmila Buzkova (France)
 EuroFipa of Honour: Hanka Kasteliková (Czech Republic)
 Hackathon Prize Smart Fipa : Aquaterra - Développé par l’équipe Cachalot, composed by: Roland Dargelez, Frédéric Fréaud, Samuel Lepoil & Anne Sellès

2016,,
The 29th edition of Fipa took place in Biarritz from the 19th until the 24th of January 2016.

Drama 
 Fipa d'or: Birthday""5 by Roger Michell  (United-Kingdom)
 Fipa d'or Best Actress: Marie Baümer in Brief an mein Leben (Germany)
 Fipa d'or Best Actor: Nicolas Rojas in Zamudio, perdidos en la noche (Chili)
 Fipa d'or Best Script: Viktor Oszkár Nagy & Petra Szöcs for Hivatal (Hungary)
 Fipa d'or Best Original Score: Alexander Balanescu & Ariel Sommer for The Scandalous Lady W (United-Kingdom)

Series 
 Fipa d'or: Historia de un clan by Sebastián Ortega (Argentina)
 Fipa d'or Best Actor: Stellan Skarsgård in River (United-Kingdom, United-States)
 Fipa d'or Best Actress: Steinunn Ólína Þorsteinsdóttir in Case (Island)
 Fipa d'or Best Script: Lior Raz, Avi Issacharoff, Moshe Zonder, Michal Aviram, Asaf Beiser et Leora Kamenetsky pour Fauda (Israel)
 Fipa d'or Best Original Score: Luis Ortega & Daniel Melingo for Historia de un clan (Argentina)

Other formats 
 Fipa d'or Documentary: Le Siège by Rémy Ourdan & Patrick Chauvel (France, Bosnia-Herzegovina)
 Fipa d'or Reportage and Investigation: La Bataille de Florange by Jean-Claude Poirson (France)
 Fipa d'or Performing Arts: Zpověď zapomenutého by Petr Vaclav (Czech Republic)
 Fipa d'or Smart Fipa: WEI or Die by Simon Bouisson (France)

Other awards 
 Michel Mitrani Prize: Vue de l’esprit de Sébastien Simon & Forest Ian Etsler (France), Special distinction attributed to Villeneuve by Agathe Poche (France)
 Young Europeans Jury Prize: Burden of Peace by Joey Boink (The Netherlands)
 Prix Télérama: Loro di Napoli by Pierfrancesco Li Donni (Italy)
 Audience Award: Corée, nos soldats oubliés by Cédric Condon & Jean-Yves Le Naour
 EuroFipa of Honour: Dan Frank (France)
 Hackathon Prize Smart Fipa: Mnémésis - Developed by the Pharmakon team, composed by: Simon Bonnacie, Roland Dargelez, Doris Lanzmann, Julie Scheid & Éric Suard

2015,, 
The 28th edition of Fipa took place in Biarritz from the 20th until the 25th of January 2015.

Drama 
 Fipa d'or : Marvellous by Julian Farino (United-Kingdom)
 Fipa d'or Best Actor: Juana Acosta in Sanctuaire (France)
 Fipa d'or Best Actress: Toby Jones in Marvellous (United-Kingdom)
 Fipa d'or Best Script: Pierre Erwan Guillaume, Olivier Masset-Depasse, Quitterie Duhurt-Gaussères, Xabi Molia for Sanctuaire (France)
 Fipa d'or Best Original Score: Matthias Weber, Paul Galister for Beautiful girl (Austria)

Series 
 Fipa d'or: Happy Valley by Sally Wainwright, Euros Lyn & Tim Fywell (United-Kingdom)
 Fipa d'or Best Actor: Jurgen Delnaet in Marsman de Mathias Sercu (Belgium)
 Fipa d'or Best Actress: Marie Dompnier in Les Témoins d’Hervé Hadmar (France)
 Fipa d'or Best Script: Shelley Birse for The Code (Australia)
 Fipa d'or Best Original Score: Kristian Selin Eidnes Andersen for Kampen Om Tungtvannet (La Bataille de l’eau lourde) (Norway)

Other formats 
 Fipa d'or Documentary: Pekka by Alexander Oey (The Netherlands)
 Fipa d'or Reportage and Investigation: Taïga by Hamid Sardar (France)
 Fipa d'or Performing Arts: Mia Oikgeniaki Ypothesi  by Angeliki Aristomenopoulou (Greece)
 Fipa d'or Smart Fipa: Soundhunters by Nicolas Blies, Béryl Koltz, Marion Guth, François Le Gall, Stéphane Hueber-Blies (Luxembourg)

Other awards 
 Michel Mitrani Prize: Marsman by Mathias Sercu (Belgium)
 Young Europeans Jury Prize: Peace on the Tigris by Takeharu Watai (Japan)
 Prix Télérama: Rwanda, la vie après – Paroles de mères by Benoît Dervaux & André Versaille (Belgium)
 Jérôme Minet Prize: Les Heures souterraines by Philippe Harel (France)
 Audience Award: Rwanda, la vie après - Paroles de mères de Benoît Dervaux et André Versaille (Belgium)
 EuroFipa of Honour: Chris Chibnall for Broadchurch and all of his career (United-Kingdom)
 Hackathon Prize of the Smart Fipa: Qu'est-ce qu'elle a ma gaule? - Developed by: Simon Falgaronne, Céline Ferret, Joris Fuluhea, Gabriel Grandjouan, Marie-Paule Jiccio & Arthur Martineau

2014,, 
The 27th edition of Fipa took place in Biarritz from the 21st until the 24th of January 2014.

Drama 
 Fipa d'or: 3 x Manon by Jean-Xavier by Lestrade (France)
 Fipa d'or Best Actress: Emily Watson in The Politician's Husband (United-Kingdom)
 Fipa d'or Best Actor: Eduard Fernández in Barefoot on Red Soil (Spain)
 Fipa d'or Best Script: Britta Stöckle for Pass gut auf ihn auf (Germany)
 Fipa d'or Best Original Score: David Cervera for Barefoot on Red Soil (Spain)

Series 
 Fipa d'or: Arvingerne by Pernilla August (Denmark)
 Fipa d'or Best Actress: Helen McCrory in Peaky Blinders (United-Kingdom)
 Fipa d'or Best Actor: Cillian Murphy in Peaky Blinders (United-Kingdom)
 Fipa d'or Best Script: Maya Ilsøe for Arvingerne (Danemark)
 Fipa d'or Best Original Score: Martin Phipps for Peaky Blinders (United-Kingdom)

Other formats 
 Fipa d'or Documentary: Chante ton bac d'abord by David André (France)
 Fipa d'or Reportage and Investigation: Congo Business Case by Hans Bouma (The Netherlands)
 Fipa d'or Performing Arts: Colin Davis in His Own Words by John Bridcut (United-Kingdom)
 Smart Fipa: 1914, Dernières nouvelles by Bérénice Meinsohn (France)

Other awards 
 Michel Mitrani Prize: Le Copain d'avant by Françoise-Renée Jamet & Laurent Marocco (France)
 Jury's Award:  Bringing Tibet Home by Tenzin Tsetan Choklay (United-States)
 Prix Télérama: Art War by Marco Wilms (Germany)
 Jérôme Minet Prize: Des fleurs pour Algernon by Yves Angelo (France)

2009,, 
The 22nd edition of Fipa took place in Biarritz from the 20th until the 25th of January.

Drama
Fipa d'or Grand Prize: Ihr könnt Euch niemals sicher sein
Fipa d'or Best Actor: Baruch Brener – Brothers
Fipa d'or Best Actress: Orna Fitoussi – Brothers
Fipa d'or Best Original Soundtrack: Angélique Nachon and Jean-Claude Nachon – L'affaire Salengro
Fipa d'or Best Screenplay: Eva Zahn and Volker A Zahn – Ihr könnt Euch niemals sicher sein
Fipa d'argent Special Prize: Un homme d'honneur

Series and serials
Fipa d'or Grand Prize: De smaak van De Keyser (a.k.a. The Emperor of Taste)
Fipa d'or Best Actor: Pierre Verville – Les Lavigueur, la vraie histoire (a.k.a. The Lavigueurs, the True Story)
Fipa d'or Best Actress: Marieke Dilles – De smaak van De Keyser (a.k.a. The Emperor of Taste)
Fipa d'or Best Original Soundtrack: Wim De Wilde – De smaak van De Keyser (a.k.a. The Emperor of Taste)
Fipa d'or Best Screenplay: Salvatore Mereu – Sonetaùla
Fipa d'or Special Prize: Les Lavigueur, la vraie histoire (a.k.a. The Lavigueurs, the True Story)

See also

 List of television festivals

References

External links
 
 FIPA Historique 

Television festivals